Stephen Perry was a 19th-century British inventor and businessman. His corporation was the Messers Perry and Co, Rubber Manufacturers of London, which made early products from vulcanised rubber. On 17 March 1845, Perry received a patent for the rubber band.

References

See also 
Other people surnamed Perry

British inventors
Year of death missing
Year of birth missing